Document! X is a documentation generator which automates technical documentation production for C#/VB.NET/C++/CLI or other .NET language assemblies, Java Projects, databases, COM components, type libraries, XSD schemas and ASP.NET Ajax Javascript. Document! X consists of an authoring and documentation build environment (including HTML based Visual Authoring tools) as well as Visual Comment Editor Add-Ins for Visual Studio (2005, 2008, 2010 and 11).

See also
Comparison of documentation generators

External links
 Document! X webpage

Documentation generators